The Quincy Library (also known as the Quincy Academy) is a historic library in Quincy, Florida, United States. It is located 303 North Adams Street. On September 9, 1974, it was added to the U.S. National Register of Historic Places.

The building was built in 1850-1851 for the Quincy Academy.  It has had numerous uses through Quincy's history.

The Quincy Women's Library Club opened its library in the building in 1931 and the library was still operating in 1973.

Gallery

References

External links

 Gadsden County listings at National Register of Historic Places
 Florida's Office of Cultural and Historical Programs
 Gadsden County listings
 Gadsden County markers
 Quincy Library

School buildings completed in 1850
Buildings and structures in Gadsden County, Florida
Libraries in Florida
Libraries on the National Register of Historic Places in Florida
National Register of Historic Places in Gadsden County, Florida
1850 establishments in Florida